The Socialist Union of Popular Forces (USFP) is a social-democratic political party in Morocco.

History and profile
The USFP was formed as a breakaway from the National Union of Popular Forces (UNFP), a socialist opposition party which had itself split from the Istiqlal Party in 1959. The USFP was established in 1975.

The party won the 1997 parliamentary election, then led the government of Morocco with a centre-left coalition. During this period Abderrahmane Youssoufi, the leader of the party, was the Prime Minister of Morocco.

In the parliamentary election held on 27 September 2002, the party won 50 out of 325 seats, making it the largest party in the Moroccan parliament. Following those elections it formed a government with the Istiqlal Party in a three-party coalition known as the "Koutla".

In the next parliamentary election, held on 7 September 2007, the USFP won 38 out of 325 seats, losing 12 seats and becoming only the fifth largest party in parliament. The USFP was included in the government of Prime Minister Abbas El Fassi, formed on 15 October 2007.

The USFP is a full member of the Socialist International and an observer of the Party of European Socialists.

In the run-up to the November 2011 parliamentary elections, the USFP sought to present a united front with the Party of Progress and Socialism (PPS) and Democratic Forces Front (FFD) to reverse the loss of support for the Moroccan left in the preceding years. The party placed fifth, with 39 seats, in the 2011 elections.

Electoral performance

References

External links
Official website

1975 establishments in Morocco
Full member parties of the Socialist International
Parties related to the Party of European Socialists
Political parties established in 1975
Political parties in Morocco
Progressive Alliance
Social democratic parties in Africa
Socialist parties in Morocco